Brassaiopsis elegans is a species of shrub in the family Araliaceae.

References

External links 
 Brassaiopsis elegans at The Plant List
 Brassaiopsis elegans at Tropicos

elegans
Plants described in 1913
Shrubs